Richard John Bartel (born February 3, 1983) is a former American football quarterback in the National Football League for the Dallas Cowboys, Cleveland Browns, Jacksonville Jaguars, Washington Redskins and Arizona Cardinals. He played college football at Tarleton State. He also played baseball in the Cincinnati Reds minor league organization.

Early years
Bartel attended Grapevine High School, where he lettered in football and baseball. As a junior, he passed for over 1,500 yards and 18 touchdowns.

As a senior in football, he passed for over 2,800 yards and 27 touchdowns, while leading his team to a 7-4 record and a state playoff appearance. He was named the District Offensive Player of the Year, All-Area, All-District 6-4A and All-State Class 4A. He graduated in 2001.

As a senior in baseball, he was an All-District pitcher.

Baseball career
Bartel was selected as a pitcher by the Cincinnati Reds in the 17th round of the 2001 Major League Baseball Draft. He pitched for the Gulf Coast League Reds from 2001 to 2003.

College career
Bartel accepted a football scholarship from Southern Methodist University. As a redshirt freshman in 2002, he shared the quarterback position with Tate Wallis, appearing in 7 games, while completing 89-of-148 attempts (60.1%), 1,078 yards, 8 touchdowns and 8 interceptions. 

As a sophomore in 2003, he shared the quarterback position with Wallis and Chris Phillips. He completed 68-of-151 attempts (45%), 797 yards, 4 touchdowns and 9 interceptions.

In the fall of 2004, he transferred to Tarleton State University to complete his final two seasons of college eligibility. As a junior, he completed 153-of-253 passes, for a 60.5% (third in school history), 1,883 yards, 12 touchdowns and 11 interceptions.

As a senior, he completed 161-of-276 passes (58.3%), 2,033 yards, 16 touchdowns and 5 interceptions. He averaged 202.3 yards passing per contest. In Tarleton he played in 20 games, completing 314 of 529 passes, a 59.4% (third in school history), 3,906 yards, 128 touchdowns and an average of 195.3 passing yards per contest.

Professional career

Dallas Cowboys
Bartel was signed as an undrafted free agent following an invite to participate in the Dallas Cowboys' mini-camp after the 2007 NFL Draft. On September 1, he was waived and later signed to the practice squad, after rookie quarterback Matt Moore was claimed by the Carolina Panthers.

On August 30, 2008, he was released and later signed to the practice squad, only to be cut on September 8.

Cleveland Browns
Bartel was signed to the practice squad of the Cleveland Browns on November 26, 2008 after quarterback Brady Quinn was placed on the injured reserve list. Bartel was activated from the practice squad on December 24, 2008, when Ken Dorsey was placed on injured reserve. Bartel was waived by the Browns on September 5, 2009.

Jacksonville Jaguars
On September 7, 2009, he was signed to the Jacksonville Jaguars' practice squad.

Washington Redskins
On November 25, 2009, he was signed by the Washington Redskins from the Jaguars' practice squad. The next year, head coach Jim Zorn was replaced with Mike Shanahan and Bartel was cut on September 4, 2010, after being passed on the depth chart by John Beck.

Sacramento Mountain Lions
On September 14, 2010, he was signed by the Sacramento Mountain Lions of the United Football League.

Arizona Cardinals
On December 7, 2010, Bartel was signed by the Arizona Cardinals after Max Hall was placed on the injured reserve list. He played in his first regular season NFL game on January 2, 2011, against the host San Francisco 49ers. During that game, he completed his first regular season pass, a 31-yard completion to Larry Fitzgerald late in the third quarter, in relief of starting quarterback John Skelton. He played against the 49ers once again, replacing Skelton, on November 20, 2011, while throwing his first touchdown pass to Larry Fitzgerald. 

On September 3, 2012, he was waived with an injury settlement due to a right shoulder injury he suffered in the preseason finale against the Denver Broncos.

NFL career statistics

Source:

Coaching career
On January 29, 2015, after stints at Plano Prestonwood and Argyle Liberty Christian School, he was hired as the football head coach for Southwest Christian High School in Fort Worth. In June 2015, he left to become the football offensive coordinator at IMG Academy. He was named quarterbacks coach for the Atlanta Legends of the Alliance of American Football in January 2019, and became the offensive play-caller after offensive coordinator Michael Vick left the team in February 2019. Bartel resigned on February 22, 2019.

Personal life
Bartel is married to Alecia Bartel and has four daughters.

References

External links

Tarlenton State Texans bio

1983 births
Living people
People from Grapevine, Texas
Players of American football from Texas
American football quarterbacks
SMU Mustangs football players
Tarleton State Texans football players
Dallas Cowboys players
Cleveland Browns players
Jacksonville Jaguars players
Washington Redskins players
Sacramento Mountain Lions players
Arizona Cardinals players
Gulf Coast Reds players
Baseball pitchers
Baseball players from Texas
High school football coaches in Texas
Atlanta Legends coaches